Cybister ('kybistētēr' = diver, tumbler), is a genus of beetle in family Dytiscidae. They are found in much of the world, including all continents except Antarctica. As of 2021 there are 96 species and 9 additional subspecies among four subgenera in the genus.

Description 
Adult Cybister have broad hind legs with unequal tarsal claws (the inner claw being smaller and sometimes absent) and a fringe on the outer margin of the tarsus. They range in length from 13 mm (C. parvus from Brazil) to 43 mm (C. bimaculatus from the Afrotropics). Adult males of the North American species have several ridges on the coxae of the hind legs, forming a stridulatory device.

Larvae have a frontal tooth on the head and lack cerci. North American species can grow up to 80 mm long.

Ecology 
Cybister live in lentic (still fresh water) habitats that have vegetation.

Like other diving beetles, Cybister are predatory. Larvae of C. japonicus prey on insects (mainly Odonata nymphs and the backswimmer Notonecta triguttata) in their first two instars, while third-instar larvae prey on vertebrates (tadpoles and fish). Larvae of C. rugosus feed on both invertebrates and vertebrates in all instars.

Importance 
Cybister chinensis (sometimes misidentified as C. japonicus) is used in a game in Korea. The water beetle game (mul bang gae nori) is played in an oval, water-filled tank with vertical flanges along its inner edge and prizes on the tank rim. The game is played by dropping a C. chinensis through a funnel into the center of the tank, after which it swims towards the edge of the tank and stops in one of the slots formed by the metal flanges. If a prize is above this slot, the player wins it.

The swimming behaviour of C. lateralimarginalis has inspired (biomimetics) the design of a legged underwater robot.

List of species

Subgenus Cybister Curtis, 1827
 Cybister alluaudi Guignot, 1936
 Cybister bengalensis Aubé, 1838
 Cybister buqueti Aubé, 1838
 Cybister cardoni Severin, 1890
 Cybister celebensis Sharp, 1882
 Cybister cephalotes Sharp, 1882
 Cybister chinensis Motschulsky, 1854
 Cybister cinctus Sharp, 1882
 Cybister cognatus Sharp, 1882
 Cybister concessor Guignot, 1947
 Cybister confusus Sharp, 1882
 Cybister crassipes Sharp, 1882
 Cybister crassiusculus Régimbart, 1895
 Cybister dejeanii Aubé, 1838
 Cybister dytiscoides Sharp, 1882
 Cybister ellipticus LeConte, 1852
 Cybister explanatus LeConte, 1852
 Cybister extenuans (Walker, 1858)
 Cybister favareli Guignot, 1936
 Cybister fimbriolatus (Say, 1823)
 Cybister fumatus Sharp, 1882
 Cybister godeffroyi (Wehncke, 1876)
 Cybister gracilis Sharp, 1882
 Cybister gschwendtneri Guignot, 1935
 Cybister guerini Aubé, 1838
 Cybister guignoti Gschwendtner, 1936
 Cybister guignoti pseudosenegalensis Guignot, 1936
 Cybister hypomelas Régimbart, 1892
 Cybister janczyki Mouchamps, 1957
 Cybister javanus Aubé, 1838
 Cybister laevis Falkenström, 1936
 Cybister lateralimarginalis (De Geer, 1774)
 Cybister lateralimarginalis ponticus Sharp, 1882
 Cybister lateralimarginalis torquatus (Fischer von Waldheim, 1829)
 Cybister lewisianus Sharp, 1873
 Cybister limbatus (Fabricius, 1775)
 Cybister loxidiscus Wilke, 1920
 Cybister natalensis (Wehncke, 1876)
 Cybister nebulosus Gschwendtner, 1931
 Cybister occidentalis Aubé, 1838
 Cybister pectoralis Sharp, 1882
 Cybister pederzanii Rocchi, 1979
 Cybister reichei Aubé, 1838
 Cybister rugosus (W.S.Macleay, 1825)
 Cybister rugulosus (Redtenbacher, 1844)
 Cybister schoutedeni Gschwendtner, 1932
 Cybister semiaciculatus Schaufuss, 1887
 Cybister senegalensis Aubé, 1838
 Cybister straeleni Guignot, 1952
 Cybister tibialis Sharp, 1882
 Cybister tripunctatus (Olivier, 1795)
 Cybister tripunctatus africanus Laporte, 1835
 Cybister tripunctatus lateralis (Fabricius, 1798)
 Cybister tripunctatus temnenkii Aubé, 1838
 Cybister ventralis Sharp, 1882
 Cybister weckwerthi Hendrich, 1997
 Cybister wittmeri Brancucci, 1979
 Cybister yulensis Guignot, 1956

Subgenus Megadytoides Brinck, 1945
 Cybister marginicollis Boheman, 1848

Subgenus Melanectes Brinck, 1945
 Cybister alemon Guignot, 1948
 Cybister aterrimus Régimbart, 1899
 Cybister basilewskyi Guignot, 1950
 Cybister bellicosus Guignot, 1947
 Cybister bimaculatus Aubé, 1838
 Cybister blotei Guignot, 1936
 Cybister brevis Aubé, 1838
 Cybister burgeoni Guignot, 1947
 Cybister convexus Sharp, 1882
 Cybister dehaanii Aubé, 1838
 Cybister desjardinsii Aubé, 1838
 Cybister dissentiens Mouchamps, 1957
 Cybister distinctus Régimbart, 1878
 Cybister ertli Zimmermann, 1917
 Cybister feraudi Guignot, 1934
 Cybister griphodes Guignot, 1942
 Cybister immarginatus Fabricius, 1798) 
 Cybister insignis Sharp, 1882
 Cybister insignis caprai Guignot, 1949
 Cybister insignis purpureovirgatus Guignot, 1946
 Cybister irritans (Dohrn, 1875)
 Cybister longulus Gschwendtner, 1932
 Cybister lynceus J.Balfour-Browne, 1950
 Cybister mesomelas Guignot, 1942
 Cybister mocquerysi Régimbart, 1895
 Cybister modestus Sharp, 1882
 Cybister nigrescens Gschwendtner, 1933
 Cybister nigripes Wehncke, 1876
 Cybister operosus Sharp, 1882
 Cybister owas Laporte, 1835
 Cybister papuanus Guignot, 1956
 Cybister pinguis Régimbart, 1895
 Cybister posticus Aubé, 1838
 Cybister procax Guignot, 1947
Cybister procax vicinatus Mouchamps, 1957
 Cybister prolixus Sharp, 1882
 Cybister semirugosus Harold, 1878
 Cybister siamensis Sharp, 1882
 Cybister smaragdinus Régimbart, 1895
 Cybister sugillatus Erichson, 1834
 Cybister sumatrensis Régimbart, 1883
 Cybister thermolytes Guignot, 1947
 Cybister vicinus Zimmermann, 1917
 Cybister vulneratus Klug, 1834
 Cybister zimmermanni Mouchamps, 1957

Subgenus Neocybister K.B. Miller, Bergsten & Whiting, 2007
 Cybister festae Griffini, 1895
 Cybister puncticollis (Brullé, 1837)

Subgenus unknown
 Cybister parvus Trémouilles, 1984

Fossil species
These seven extinct species are known only from fossils:
 †Cybister agassizi Heer, 1862
 †Cybister atavus Heer, 1862
 †Cybister fractus Riha, 1974
 †Cybister imperfectus Riha, 1974
 †Cybister mancus Riha, 1974
 †Cybister nicoleti Heer, 1862
 †Cybister rotundatus Riha, 1974

References

External links
Cybister on Fauna Europaea
Cybister on BugGuide.Net
 Synopsis of the described coleoptera of the world

Dytiscidae genera
Dytiscidae